Wayanad Lok Sabha Constituency is one of the twenty Parliamentary Constituencies (Lok Sabha) in Kerala State in southern India.

Assembly segments

Wayanad Parliamentary Constituency is composed of the following Kerala Legislative Assembly Constituencies:

Members of Parliament

Election results

General election 2019

General election 2014

General election 2009

See also
 2019 Indian general election in Kerala

References

Lok Sabha constituencies in Kerala
Politics of Wayanad district